Paola Bonato  (born 31 January 1961) is an Italian footballer who played as a defender for the Italy women's national football team. She accrued 71 caps between 1983 and 1991, and was part of the team at four editions of the UEFA Women's Championship and at the inaugural 1991 FIFA Women's World Cup. In a 19-year career at club level she won seven Serie A winner's medals and three Coppa Italia winner's medals, while playing for Trani, Lazio and Reggiana.

Club career
Bonato began playing for Verona when she was 14 years old. She continued to live and work in Mozzecane after transferring to Trani in 1982, where she won Serie A three times and the Coppa Italia once. She also won Serie A in her first season after moving to Lazio, then won three more Serie A titles and two more Coppa Italias with Reggiana. She finished her career after spending one season with newly-promoted Serie A club Lugo.

International career
Bonato made her first appearance for the national team on 24 April 1983, a 3–0 1984 European Competition for Women's Football qualifying win over France at Stadio Romeo Menti in Vicenza. Her 71st and final appearance was the 3–2 (after extra time) 1991 FIFA Women's World Cup quarter final defeat by Norway at Jiangmen Stadium. In between she had played in the semi finals of the 1984, 1987, 1989 and 1991 editions of the UEFA Women's Championship.

Bonato may have collected more than 71 national team appearances, but her employer – the Municipality of Mozzecane – had refused to grant her any additional time off.

Style of play
The Dizionario del Calcio Italiano described Bonato as a gritty and determined marker, who was not elegant but was hard to get past. She was versatile enough to play in any of the defensive positions. In May 2020 Antonella Carta described Bonato as the most difficult opponent she had faced.

Career statistics

Honours

Trani
 Serie A: 1984, 1985, 1985–86
 Coppa Italia: 1983

Lazio
 Serie A: 1987–88

Reggiana
 Serie A: 1989–90, 1990–91, 1992–93
 Coppa Italia: 1991–92, 1992–93

Italy
 Mundialito: 1984, 1986

References

External links
 

1961 births
Living people
Italian women's footballers
Italy women's international footballers
1991 FIFA Women's World Cup players
Women's association football defenders
A.S.D. Reggiana Calcio Femminile players
Serie A (women's football) players
S.S. Lazio Women 2015 players
A.C.F. Trani 80 players
Footballers from Veneto